Whistling in the Dark, released in 1979, is the first studio album released by Max Gronenthal, also known as Max Carl.

Track listing
Sources:
 "Sailfish"
 "Still I Wonder"
 "You"
 "Lookin' For A Girl"
 "Get It Straight"
 "I Know Your In There"
 "Sonya"
 "I Can't Leave The City"
 "All The Time"
 "Faded Satin Lady" (Tommy Bolin & Max Gronenthal)

Personnel
Source:
Will McFarlane - guitar
Gerard McMahon - vocals
Bill Meeker - drums
Michael O'Neill - guitar
Bruce Steinberg - cover design
Trey Thompson - bass guitar
Patrick Simmons - vocals
Tim Goodman - guitar
Rocke Grace - vocals
Max Gronenthal - keyboards, vocals
Michael James Jackson - producer
Kenny Loggins - vocals
Michael McDonald - vocals
James Newton Howard - synthesizer

References

External links
 Max Gronenthal- Whistling in the Dark @Discogs.com.

1979 debut albums
Chrysalis Records albums
Max Carl albums